Niepars is a municipality in the Vorpommern-Rügen district, in Mecklenburg-Vorpommern, Germany. The former municipalities Kummerow and Neu Bartelshagen were merged into Niepars in May 2019.

References